The Low Spark of High Heeled Boys is the fifth studio album by English rock band Traffic, released in 1971. The album was Traffic's most successful in the United States, reaching number 7 on the Billboard 200 and becoming their only platinum-certified album there, indicating sales in excess of one million. However, it failed to chart in the United Kingdom. The album features the minor hit "Rock & Roll Stew" and the title track, which received heavy FM airplay.

Background
It was Traffic's first studio album to feature percussionist Rebop Kwaku Baah, and the only studio appearance of drummer Jim Gordon and bassist Ric Grech. Grech had previously worked with Traffic singer/multi-instrumentalist Steve Winwood in the short-lived supergroup Blind Faith. This is the only Traffic album to feature two lead vocals by Jim Capaldi ("Light Up or Leave Me Alone" and "Rock & Roll Stew"). His only other solo lead vocal on a Traffic studio album was on "Dealer" from Mr. Fantasy (1967).

As with other Traffic albums, The Low Spark of High Heeled Boys featured varied influences, including jazz, folk music and Classical. The name of the album's title track was suggested by the actor Michael J. Pollard.

The LP's front cover is notable for its top right and bottom left corners being clipped, giving the illusion of a three-dimensional cube. This effect would be repeated on their next album, Shoot Out at the Fantasy Factory. On original pressings of the UK and some European versions, the title of both the album and song are shown as 'The Low Spark of High-Heeled Boys' (with a hyphen) on the record labels.

Reception

Critical retrospectives on the album are generally positive. AllMusic was overwhelmingly approving in its assessment, praising the variety brought by the non-Winwood/Capaldi compositions and the power of the lengthy title track, and claiming the album "marked the commercial and artistic apex of the second coming of Traffic". In addition, Robert Christgau commented on the band's growth from previous efforts, stating that while the group is "devoid of intellectual thrust," they're "onto something," and "when it works, it suggests a nice paradox—relaxed and exciting at the same time." Pop Matters offered yet another viewpoint, calling it "an album that's easy to listen to over and over, but one that seldom shows up on 'best of' lists." It commented that most of the songs are highly underrated and require multiple listens to appreciate. It was voted number 625 in Colin Larkin's All Time Top 1000 Albums 3rd Edition (2000).

The album was certified gold less than a year after its release in the United States, and eventually certified platinum in 1996. It was remastered and reissued with one bonus track on 19 March 2002.

Track listing

The first six songs as listed here are the track order as originally released on LP in the US and many parts of the world.  Both LP and CD pressings exist with “Light Up Or Leave Me Alone” as the fifth track of the album instead of the third. (Awaiting confirmation of when the alternate track order first appeared in these formats.)

Note: This is different from the "Rock & Roll Stew Part 1" and "Part 2" recordings on the single. It is a previously unreleased version which is the most complete studio performance of the song. The album version fades earlier than this version. Part 1 on the single is an edit (with shortened instrumental break) of the album version. Part 2 (side B of the single) fades in at a point past the album version's fadeout. This is also the version of "Rock & Roll Stew" that appears on the Gold compilation.

Personnel

Traffic 
 Steve Winwood – lead vocals (1, 2, 5, 6), backing vocals, acoustic piano, Hammond organ, guitars 
 Chris Wood – saxophones, flute
 Ric Grech – bass, violin
 Jim Gordon – drums (1-5)
 Jim Capaldi – percussion, lead vocals (3, 4), backing vocals (6)
 Rebop Kwaku Baah  – percussion 
with:
 Mike Kellie – drums (6) [uncredited]

Production 
 Steve Winwood – producer 
 Brian Humphries – engineer
 Tony Wright – cover art
 Richard Polak – photography

Charts

Certifications

References

Traffic (band) albums
1971 albums
Island Records albums
Albums produced by Steve Winwood